James Miller (10 February 1871 – 5 February 1907) was a Scottish footballer who played for Sunderland, Rangers and the Scotland national football team as a forward.

Club career
Initially playing with hometown village team Annbank, Miller was one of several skilled Scottish players brought to Sunderland by manager Tom Watson, which collectively became known as the 'team of all talents'. A player noted for his skill on the ball rather than physical power, he made his debut for the Black Cats on 13 September 1890 against Burnley, a match Sunderland lost 3–2. He played for Sunderland over two different spells: 1890–96 (winning three Football League championships in four seasons) and 1900–04 (claiming a fourth title), separated by a stint in his homeland at Rangers where he won two Scottish Football League titles and two Scottish Cups. Overall he made 260 appearances for Sunderland, scoring 123 goals. His uncle Billy Dunlop (only two years older) was a teammate at Sunderland and Rangers, and his wife Marion was the sister of another teammate, Will Gibson.

He later had a short spell with West Bromwich Albion and then joined Chelsea for the club's first-ever season, but although registered as a player he did not make a competitive appearance and was mainly acting as trainer, the role he was still in at the time of his death from tuberculosis in February 1907, aged 36.

International career
Having been considered ineligible for selection during his productive first spell at Sunderland (the Scottish Football Association ignored players at English clubs until 1896), Miller was capped for Scotland three times between 1897 and 1898 during his time with Rangers, scoring twice, both in matches against England; his first was the winning goal to secure the 1896–97 British Home Championship at Crystal Palace, while his second at Celtic Park almost exactly a year later proved to be merely a consolation for the hosts as England won both the match and the tournament. He also represented the Scottish League XI three times in the same period.

Honours
Sunderland
Football League: 1891–92, 1892–93, 1894–95, 1901–02
World Championship: 1895
Sheriff of London Charity Shield: 1902–03

Rangers
Scottish League Division One: 1898–99, 1899–1900
Scottish Cup: 1896–97, 1897–98; runner-up 1898–99
Glasgow Cup: 1896–97, 1897–98
Glasgow Merchants Charity Cup: 1896–97, 1899–1900
Glasgow Football League: 1897–98

Scotland
British Home Championship: 1896–97

References

External links 

Scottish footballers
Footballers from South Ayrshire
Scotland international footballers
Sunderland A.F.C. players
Annbank F.C. players
Rangers F.C. players
Chelsea F.C. players
West Bromwich Albion F.C. players
1871 births
1907 deaths
Tuberculosis deaths in England
English Football League players
Scottish Football League players
Scottish Football League representative players
Chelsea F.C. non-playing staff
Association football forwards
Association football coaches
20th-century deaths from tuberculosis